The 1991 New Zealand National Soccer League was the 22nd season of a nationwide round-robin club competition in New Zealand football.

Promotion and relegation
Waterside Karori were relegated at the end of the 1990 season, to be replaced by the winner of a play-off series between teams from the northern, central, and southern leagues (Mount Albert-Ponsonby, Nelson United, and Burndale United respectively). Nelson United won the series to gain promotion, but there is some controversy about their participation in the play-offs as they had only finished second in the central regional league, which was won by Petone.

Gisborne City were relegated at the end of the 1991 season.

League table

References

New Zealand National Soccer League seasons
1
New Zealand